Bluestone or blue stone may refer to:

Minerals and stones
 Bluestone, a building stone of various lithologies
 Pennsylvania Bluestone, a bluestone from a specific region in the United States
 Copper(II) sulfate, hydrated form of the chemical compound
 Chalcanthite, hydrated copper(II) sulfate mineral
 Lazurite, a sulfide of sodium aluminium silicate and the core constituent of lapis lazuli
 Sin-Kamen (in Russian literally: Blue Stone), a type of pagan sacred stones, widespread in Russia

Places
Preseli Hills, known as the bluestone area of Pembrokeshire
Bluestone, Pembrokeshire, a luxury holiday resort in the Pembrokeshire National Park

Fiction
 Matt Bluestone, a character from the Gargoyles
 Bluestone 42, a British comedy drama TV series

Other
 Blue Stone (neutron initiator), a British nuclear weapon component
 Bluestone Television
 Blue Stone (music group), an American electronic-pop musical project
 Bluestone Group, a portfolio and asset management business
 Irving Bluestone (1917 – 2007), negotiator for workers at General Motors in the 1970s
 Bluestone family murders, 2001 crime in England